Events in the year 1899 in Iceland.

Incumbents 

 Monarch: Christian IX
 Minister for Iceland: Nicolai Reimer Rump (until 28 August); Hugo Egmont Hørring onwards

Events 

 16 February – Knattspyrnufélag Reykjavíkur is established in Reykjavík.
 28 August – Hugo Egmont Hørring is appointed Minister for Iceland.

References 

 
1890s in Iceland
Years of the 19th century in Iceland
Iceland
Iceland